Saint-Quentin-la-Motte-Croix-au-Bailly is a commune in the Somme department in Hauts-de-France in northern France.

Geography

Population

Places of interest
 The seventeenth century church at Saint-Quentin
 The sixteenth century cross

See also
Communes of the Somme department

References

Communes of Somme (department)